Sandy Hill is one of the fourteen Districts of Anguilla.  Its population at the 2011 census was 636.

Demographics

Politics 

The incumbent is Jerome Roberts of the Anguilla Progressive Party.

References

Populated places in Anguilla